Mikaël Antoine Mouradian, I.C.P.B. (born July 5, 1961) is a bishop of the Catholic Church in the United States.  He has served as the second eparch (bishop) of the Armenian Catholic Eparchy of Our Lady of Nareg in the United States of America and Canada since 2011.

Biography
Mikaël Mouradian was born in Beirut, Lebanon and ordained a priest for the Patriarchal Congregation of Bzommar on October 24, 1987 by Bishop Grégoire Ghabroyan, I.C.P.B. Pope Benedict XVI named Mouradian as the eparch of Our Lady of Nareg in New York on May 21, 2011. He was ordained a bishop by Patriarch Nerses Bedros XIX Tarmouni of the Armenian Catholic Church on July 31, 2011.  The principal co-consecrators were Archeparch Boutros Marayati of Alep, Eparch Grégoire Ghabroyan, I.C.P.B. of Sainte-Croix-de-Paris, Archeparch Nechan Karakéhéyan, I.C.P.B. of Eastern Europe and Eparch Emeritus of New York Manuel Batakian, I.C.P.B.

See also 

 Catholic Church hierarchy
 Catholic Church in the United States
 Historical list of the Catholic bishops of the United States
 List of Catholic bishops of the United States
 Lists of patriarchs, archbishops, and bishops

References

External links

 Armenian Catholic Eparchy of Our Lady of Nareg
Bishop Mikael Antoine Mouradian

Episcopal succession

1961 births
Living people
Religious leaders from Beirut
Members of the Patriarchal Congregation of Bzommar
Lebanese people of Armenian descent
Armenian Catholic bishops
21st-century Eastern Catholic bishops
American Eastern Catholic bishops
21st-century American clergy